Pride is an album by saxophonist Lee Konitz recorded in 1999 and released on the Danish SteepleChase label.

Critical reception

Scott Yanow of Allmusic said "The music always swings, the rhythm section is supportive, and Konitz is as inventive as always. This is also one of the few sessions in which the altoist (on a few cuts) is backed by organ". In JazzTimes, Bill Shoemaker wrote: "Pride adds to the case that Lee Konitz’s sustained creativity and prolific recording schedule have a chicken and egg relationship. Fronting contrasting rhythm sections, Konitz not only improvises with his trademark sublime mix of subtlety and adventurousness, but also contributes 3 tunes to the date, reinforcing his less heralded status as a resourceful composer ... Given Konitz’s output with more high-profile musicians, Pride is prone to being lost in the crowd, but those enamored Konitz’s knack for giving well-worn vehicles new traction will dig it".

Track listing 
All compositions by Lee Konitz except where noted
 "Monkian' Around" – 4:46
 "Triste" (Antônio Carlos Jobim) – 6:54
 "Come Rain or Come Shine" (Harold Arlen, Johnny Mercer) – 7:00
 "Stellar"- 13:35
 "Gundula"- 8:09
 "Secret Love" (Sammy Fain, Paul Francis Webster) – 11:50	
 "Lover Man" (Jimmy Davis, Roger "Ram" Ramirez, James Sherman) – 8:00
 "Zingaro" (Jobim) – 6:49

Personnel 
Lee Konitz – alto saxophone
George Colligan – piano, organ
Doug Weiss – bass
Darren Beckett – drums

References 

Lee Konitz albums
2000 albums
SteepleChase Records albums